Conchylodes octonalis, the eight-barred lygropia moth, is a snout moth in the family Crambidae. It was described by Zeller in 1873. It is found in North America, where it has been recorded from central and southern California to Texas and from Iowa, Mississippi, Nevada, New Mexico, Oklahoma and Tennessee. The habitat consists of low-elevation arid areas.

The length of the forewings is 7.5-8.5 mm. The forewings are white to pale yellow with four brownish-orange bars along the costa. These bars are connected to small markings along the inner margin with fine wavy lines. The hindwings are white. Adults are on wing from late March to October.

The larvae have been recorded feeding on Heliotropium curassavicum.

References

Moths described in 1873